Emily Carr Secondary School (E.C.S.S or Emily Carr) is a high school in Woodbridge, Ontario, Canada, part of the city of Vaughan. It was established on September 1, 2003 and celebrated its first graduating class in 2007.  The school is administered by the York Region District School Board. Most students from this high school come from the schools near the area. For example, Fossil Hill Public School, Elders Mills Public School, Vellore Woods Public School, Lorna Jackson Public School, Pierre Berton Public School, Saint Stephen's Catholic Elementary School and a few more.

Courses
Emily Carr Secondary School features classes in The Arts, Business, Law, Geography, History, English, French, Italian, English as a Second Language, Physical Education, Mathematics, Science, Social Sciences and Humanities, Special Education, Technologies, and Alternate Education.

Sports
ECSS offers a number of sport programs to its students.

Fall
Girls Basketball
Boys Volleyball
Boys Soccer
Co-ed Tennis
Co-ed Golf
Co-ed Swimming

Winter
Boys Basketball
Girls Volleyball
Boys Hockey
Boys Rugby
Co-Ed Track and field
Boys Baseball
Girls Softball
Co-Ed Badminton
 Girls Soccer
Co-Ed Ultimate Frisbee

Clubs and activities
ECSS has a selection of clubs and activities (lunch and after-school) for its students.
Gaming Club
Student council
Yearbook
ECSS Music
Music Council
Stage Band (Totem)
Junior & Senior Concert Band
Jazz Choir (Rezonance)
DECA
PA announcement team
Athletic council
Math contest
Spirit squad
Origami club
"Chess" club
Drama council
Competitive Improvisation Team:  Drama Ninjas
Web page club
Helping Hands (Community charity)
Career guests
Student vs. teacher activities
Weight room
Art studio
Halloween costume contest
 Student Ambassadors
 Model United Nations
Eco Action
Beat Club

See also
Tommy Douglas Secondary School
Woodbridge College
York Region District School Board
List of high schools in Ontario

References

External links
Emily Carr Secondary School website

York Region District School Board
High schools in the Regional Municipality of York
Education in Vaughan